Metanastria hyrtaca, called the hairy caterpillar as a larva, is a moth of the family Lasiocampidae first described by Pieter Cramer in 1782. It is found in Sri Lanka.

Biology
The adult has a grayish head and thorax and a whitish abdomen. Forewings are brownish with a characteristic reddish-brown spot ringed with white. Hindwings are whitish. Larva yellowish brown with black spots and long lateral tufts of hairs. A reddish band is found in the neck region.

The caterpillar is a serious pest of many economically important crops such as cashew, badam, moringa, sapota, jamun, guava, Vachellia nilotica, Shorea robusta, Schima wallichii, Nyctanthes arbor-tristis, Mimusops elengi and ''Madhuca longifolia.

References

Moths of Asia
Moths described in 1782